SM U-16 or U-XVI was a  or U-boat of the Austro-Hungarian Navy ( or ) during World War I. U-16 was constructed in Germany and shipped by rail to Pola where she was assembled and completed in September 1915. She was commissioned in October 1915.

For most of her career, U-16 operated in the Adriatic out of Kotor patrolling off the Albanian coast. The U-boat sank one small sailing ship in November and seized another in December. U-16 carried Field Marshal Svetozar Borojević of the Austro-Hungarian Army as an observer while performing diving tests after engine repairs in January 1916. A water leak in March flooded U-16s batteries and put the U-boat out of action for about six weeks of repairs. While operating off Vlorë in mid-October 1916, U-16 sank an Italian destroyer acting as a convoy escort. U-16 was sunk in the ensuing action, but sources are not clear on the exact cause of her sinking. In all U-16 sank or captured three ships with a combined tonnage of 417. She was the only U-10-class submarine sunk during the war.

Design and construction 
U-16 was a small, coastal submarine that displaced  surfaced and  submerged. She featured a single shaft, a single  Daimler diesel engine for surface running, and a single  electric motor for submerged travel. She was designed for a crew of 17 officers and men.

U-16 was equipped with two  torpedo tubes located in the front and carried a complement of two torpedoes. Although most members of the class were outfitted with a 37 mm/23 (1.5 in) quick-firing (QF) gun to supplement their armament in October 1916, it is not known whether this upgrade had yet taken place on U-16 by the time of her sinking during that month.

U-16 was ordered by the Austro-Hungarian Navy on 1 April 1915 and laid down at AG Weser in Bremen on later in the month. When completed, the submarine was broken down into sections, loaded onto railcars, and shipped on 20 August to the Austro-Hungarian Navy's main base at Pola. After completing the eight-day journey, the sections were riveted together. Though there is no specific mention of how long it took for U-16s sections to be assembled, a sister boat, the German Type UB I submarine , shipped to Pula from Germany in mid-April 1915, was assembled in about two weeks. U-16 was delivered to the Austro-Hungarian Navy on 29 September.

Operational history 
SM U-16 was commissioned into the Austro-Hungarian Navy on 6 October under the command of Linienschiffsleutnant Eugen Hornyák Edler von Horn. Over the next month U-16 patrolled off Rimini and the Po estuary before heading to Kotor. There, U-16s second commander, Linienschiffsleutnant Orest Ritter von Zopa, assumed command on 18 November. The U-boat departed the next day to patrol off Albania. Near Cape Rodoni, Zopa stopped and boarded Fiore Albania, an Albanian sailing ship. Finding nothing amiss, the commander sent Fiore Albania on her way. Three days later, Zopa and U-16 scored their first success, when they sank the  Italian sailing vessel Unione in the Gulf of Drin. Later the same day, a torpedo attack on two cargo ships in the harbor at Shëngjin netted no results. With her supply of torpedoes expended, U-16 returned to Kotor on 24 November.

U-16 set out on her next patrol on 3 December, but had to return to fix a broken gyrocompass, and was underway for Albania the next day. On 5 December, the sailboat Xephanie was stopped, searched, and allowed to proceed. Near the same location, U-16 next encountered Fione Albania again. When stopped this time, the 62 GRT ship had Montenegrin soldiers, weapons, and ammunition aboard. The vessel was seized as a prize and taken back to Kotor. U-16 attempted two more Albanian patrols at the end of December. The first, departing Kotor on 19 December, was cut short by severe weather that forced the submarine back to port. The next attempt, on 25 December, ended when U-16 suffered engine problems. U-16 sailed for Pula on 27 December for more extensive engine repairs at the naval base there.

U-16s repairs were complete by 9 January 1916 when the submarine departed Pula for diving tests with Field Marshal Svetozar Borojević of the Austro-Hungarian Army on board as an observer. With the tests apparently successful, U-16 returned to Kotor on 18 January to resume Albanian patrols. The torpedo's aim was true, but it failed to detonate when it hit the ship. A few days later, a British Falmouth-class cruiser attacked the U-boat. On 11 March, a valve on U-16 leaked and water flooded into the boat, inundating the batteries, which released chlorine gas. The U-boat made it back to Kotor and underwent repairs that kept the boat out of action until the end of April.

From late April to early September, U-16 patrolled the Adriatic between Vlorë, Brindisi, and the Straits of Otranto. Twice during this time U-16 attacked French destroyers, but missed on both attempts. In mid June, Zopa launched torpedoes against a cargo ship without result. U-16 put in at Kotor on 3 September for a general overhaul that lasted for about a month.

Fate
On 9 October 1916, when the repairs were complete, U-16 set out for another Albanian patrol. The submarine made a detour to Djenovic on 11 October to replace another faulty gyrocompass, but quickly resumed her journey to the Vlorë area. In the ensuing action, U-16 was sunk, but sources disagree on the exact manner.

Conway's All the World's Fighting Ships 1906–1921 reports that the Italian steamer , one of the convoyed ships, rammed and damaged U-16, causing U-16s crew to scuttle their ship due to the severity of the damage. Uboat.net's U-Boat War in World War I reports that Nembo herself rammed U-16 before going down, while Robert Grant and Gordon Smith give another possible fate for U-16: that Nembos depth charges detonated and sank the submarine while Nembo was sinking. Smith reports that 11 men aboard U-16, including her commanding officer Zopa, lost their lives in the sinking, and that two survivors were picked up. U-16 was the only boat of her class to be sunk during the war.

Exploration of the wreck site
In 2015 the Albanian-American team comprising the RPM Nautical Foundation and The Albanian Center for Marine Research located a wreck south-west of Karaburun Peninsula in Vlorë County, Albania. Operation with an ROV brought images from the suspected wreck. Photographs and footage taken from this particular wreck were examined by marine experts and are thought to be of a possible First World War U-Boat. Albanian Historian and Director of ACMR Mr Auron Tare gave a presentation in September 2015 at the Albanian Academy of Science exploring the possibility that maybe this unidentifying wreck might be SM U-16. Given the proximity of the Italian reports on the place that the SM U-16 was sunk and this discovery, the team might have located the Austro-Hungarian submarine SM U-16.

Summary of raiding history

Notes

References

Bibliography 

 

 
 
 
 

U-10-class submarines
Ships built in Bremen (state)
Ships built in Pola
U-boats commissioned in 1915
World War I submarines of Austria-Hungary
U-boats sunk in 1916
World War I shipwrecks in the Mediterranean Sea
2015 archaeological discoveries